The 1926–27 season was Chelsea Football Club's eighteenth competitive season.

Table

References

External links
 1926–27 season at stamford-bridge.com

1926–27
English football clubs 1926–27 season